Moharam Asheri (born 29 April 1959) is a retired Iranian midfielder who played for Iran national under-20 football team in 1977 FIFA World Youth Championship. He was formerly played for Esteghlal Tehran.

Goal in Derby
In the Tehran derby on 7 May 1977 between Taj (now known as Esteghlal) and Persepolis, Moharam Asheri scored a goal on the 45th minute to give Taj the lead. In final minutes, Hassan Rowshan scored second goal on the 84th minute and Saeid Maragehchian scored third goal on the 88th minute. The game finished 3-0.

References

External links
 

Iran international footballers
Iranian footballers
Esteghlal F.C. players
Living people
1959 births
Association football midfielders